Zabreznica is one of ten villages in the Municipality of Žirovnica in the Upper Carniola region of Slovenia.

It is the location of Žirovnica Primary School, which serves the primary education needs of all the villages in the municipality.
Above the village, on the Reber Ridge, a church dedicated to St. Lawrence was rebuilt in the 1990s on the foundations of a Romanesque church that was demolished in 1821. It is decorated with work by the contemporary Slovene artists Janez Bernik and Andrej Jemec.

References

External links

Zabreznica at Geopedia

Populated places in the Municipality of Žirovnica